Ivanovka is a rural locality (a village) in Batyrovsky Selsoviet, Aurgazinsky District, Bashkortostan, Russia. The population was 83 as of 2010. There are 3 streets.

Geography 
Ivanovka is located 14 km east of Tolbazy (the district's administrative centre) by road. Knyazevka is the nearest rural locality.

References 

Rural localities in Aurgazinsky District